Friedman and Freedman are surnames. They may also refer to:

 Friedman Memorial Airport, public airport in Hailey, Idaho
 Friedman (unit), a neologism named after columnist Thomas L. Friedman